The 2011 Winnipeg Blue Bombers was the 54th season for the team in the Canadian Football League and their 79th overall. The Blue Bombers finished in 1st place in the East Division with a 10–8 record. The team clinched their first playoff berth since 2008 on October 7, 2011 after a 33–17 win over the Hamilton Tiger-Cats. On November 20, 2011, The Blue Bombers defeated the Tiger-Cats 19–3 in the East Final, advancing to the 99th Grey Cup and extending their Grey Cup appearances record to 24. However, the Bombers lost the Grey Cup game 34–23 to the BC Lions, extending their drought to 21 years without a Grey Cup championship. Their Grey Cup appearance marked their final playoff game played in five seasons, failing to make the playoffs in the four subsequent seasons following their loss to the Lions team. Incidentally, their first playoff game subsequent to their four-year playoff drought was also against the same BC Lions team they lost in the Grey Cup game in 2011, losing in a 32-31 come-from-behind victory for the Lions, ending the 2016 Winnipeg Blue Bombers season. Additionally, the Blue Bombers wouldn't host another playoff game again until the 2017 CFL season, this time losing to the Edmonton Eskimos 39-32.

The Blue Bombers set a franchise record for season tickets sold with 21,155 with 2011 being marketed as the last season at Canad Inns Stadium before the move to Investors Group Field. This record was in turn broken in 2012 after more than 22,000 were sold.

Offseason

CFL draft
The 2011 CFL Draft took place on Sunday, May 8, 2011. The Blue Bombers had six selections in the draft, and, for the first time since 1975, had the first overall selection in the draft. Winnipeg selected linebacker Henoc Muamba with the pick, making him the first St. Francis Xavier X-Men player to be drafted first overall. The Bombers also had the fourth overall pick after trading Steven Jyles to the Toronto Argonauts, in which they selected Jade Etienne from the University of Saskatchewan. Winnipeg also selected Kito Poblah in the 2011 supplemental draft, and must forfeit a first-round 2012 draft pick.

Preseason

Regular season

Season standings

Season schedule

Roster

Coaching staff

Player stats

Passing

Rushing

Receiving

Awards and records
CFL's Most Outstanding Defensive Player Award – Jovon Johnson, CB

2011 CFL All-Stars
OG – Brendon LaBatte, CFL All-Star
DE – Odell Willis, CFL All-Star
CB – Jovon Johnson, CFL All-Star
DB – Jonathan Hefney, CFL All-Star
S – Ian Logan, CFL All-Star

Eastern All-Stars
WR – Terrence Edwards, Eastern All-Star
OT – Glenn January, Eastern All-Star
OG – Brendon LaBatte, Eastern All-Star
DT – Doug Brown, Eastern All-Star
DE – Odell Willis, Eastern All-Star
CB – Jovon Johnson, Eastern All-Star
DB – Jonathan Hefney, Eastern All-Star
S – Ian Logan, Eastern All-Star

Playoffs

Schedule

Bracket

East Final

Grey Cup

References

WinnWinnipeg Blue Bombers Season, 2011
2011 Winnipeg Blue Bombers season